Lasiodothiorella is a genus of fungi in the family Botryosphaeriaceae. There are 15 species.

Species
Lasiodothiorella advena
Lasiodothiorella berengeriana
Lasiodothiorella capparis
Lasiodothiorella cisti
Lasiodothiorella concinna
Lasiodothiorella creberrima
Lasiodothiorella crotonicola
Lasiodothiorella cyanthea
Lasiodothiorella ficicola
Lasiodothiorella glycosmidis
Lasiodothiorella indica
Lasiodothiorella marconii
Lasiodothiorella notabilis
Lasiodothiorella pachmarhiensis
Lasiodothiorella serjaniae

References

External links 
 Index Fungorum

Botryosphaeriales
Dothideomycetes genera